Ituna Regional Airport  is located  south-east of Ituna, Saskatchewan, Canada.

See also 
List of airports in Saskatchewan

References 

Registered aerodromes in Saskatchewan
Ituna Bon Accord No. 246, Saskatchewan